The 2014 Arkansas Razorbacks baseball team represented the University of Arkansas in baseball at the Division I level in the NCAA for the 2014 season. Dave van Horn was the coach and completed his twelfth year at his alma mater. Van Horn's Hogs won 40 games for the seventh time in his tenure.

Personnel

Roster

Coaches

Schedule

References

Arkansas Razorbacks
Arkansas Razorbacks baseball seasons
Arkansas Razorbacks baseball
Arkansas